Roland Rich (born 2 May 1951) is an Australian career diplomat who has been the head of the United Nations Democracy Fund since 2007, and is also Officer-in-Charge of the United Nations Office for Partnerships. Currently he is an assistant teaching professor at Rutgers University. Rich was Australia's Ambassador to Laos from 1994 to 1997, and founding Director of the Australian National University's Centre for Democratic Institutions from 1998 to 2005. He has also been a research fellow at the National Endowment for Democracy and served on the Australian Defence College staff.

Rich joined Australia's foreign service in 1975 and served in a variety of overseas posts, including Ambassador to Laos (1994 to 1997), before being appointed Assistant Secretary for the International Organisations Branch in Australia's Department of Foreign Affairs and Trade (1997-1998). He was then founding Director of the Australian National University's Centre for Democratic Institutions from 1998 to 2005. He was a Reagan-Fascell Democracy Fellow at the National Endowment for Democracy in 2005, and then taught in the Centre for Defence and Strategic Studies of the Australian Defence College.

A lawyer by training, Rich followed a BA in Government/Anthropology from the University of Sydney (1972) with an LLB (1975, University of Sydney) and a Masters in International Law (Australian National University, 1982). He also holds a PhD from the Australian National University.

Books
 The UN Role in Promoting Democracy (2004, with Edward Newman), United Nations University Press
 Political Parties in the Pacific Islands (2006, ed with Hambly, L & Morgan, M), Pandanus Books, Canberra.
 Pacific Asia in Quest of Democracy (2007), Lynne Rienner Publishers
 Parties and Parliaments in Southeast Asia – Non-Partisan Chambers in Indonesia, Thailand and the Philippines (2012), Routledge

References

External links
 Dr Roland Rich, Australian National University
 
 Roland Rich (2010) Situating the UN Democracy Fund. Global Governance: A Review of Multilateralism and International Organizations: October–December 2010, Vol. 16, No. 4, pp. 423–434.

Living people
1951 births
Australian public servants
Ambassadors of Australia to Laos
University of Sydney alumni
Australian National University alumni
Academic staff of the Australian National University
Australian officials of the United Nations
Reagan-Fascell Democracy Fellows